Ogolcho is a town in southeastern Ethiopia. It is the administrative center of Ziway Dugda woreda.

Overview
According to the Oromia Regional government, this town currently has telephone and postal service, but no electricity.

According to materials on the Nordic Africa Institute website, Ogolcho was the administrative center of a woreda at least as early as the 1980s.

Based on figures from the Central Statistical Agency in 2005, Ogolcho has an estimated total population of 4,338 of whom 2,220 were males and 2,118 were females. The 1994 national census reported this town had a total population of 2,424 of whom 1,204 were males and 1,220 were females.

Notes

Populated places in the Oromia Region